Hal Reid may refer to:

 Hal Reid (American football), American football coach.
 Hal Reid (actor) (1863–1920), playwright and actor